Dodd College was a private junior college for women located in Shreveport, Louisiana. It was founded in 1927 by Monroe E. Dodd a pastor, who headed the Southern Baptist Convention from 1934 to 1935 and was a radio preacher.  Dodd College closed in 1942.

Among the chairmen of the trustees was W. Scott Wilkinson, a Shreveport lawyer who served in the state House from 1920 to 1924.

References

Sources
text of historical marker

Defunct private universities and colleges in Louisiana
Universities and colleges in Shreveport, Louisiana
1927 establishments in Louisiana